Haberlandia hulstaerti is a moth in the family Cossidae. It is found in the Democratic Republic of the Congo.

The wingspan is about 21 mm. The forewings are warm buff with isabella colour lines from the costal margin towards the dorsum. The hindwings are ecru olive.

Etymology
The species is named in honour of Gustaaf Hulstaert, who collected the species.

References

Natural History Museum Lepidoptera generic names catalog

Moths described in 2011
Metarbelinae
Taxa named by Ingo Lehmann
Endemic fauna of the Democratic Republic of the Congo